MacKillop Sharks Rugby League Club, formerly known as the University Sharks, was an Australian Rugby League club which competed in the Northern Territory Rugby League competition, based out of MacKillop Catholic College in Palmerston, NT. The Club was originally founded in 1973 as the Northern Suburbs Sharks. It relocated to Palmerston in 2014 in a Partnership with MacKillop. The club was disbanded at the end of 2016, being succeeded by the Northern Sharks and the MacKillop Saints, the latter of which switched codes to Rugby Union in 2018.

Notable Juniors
Joel Romelo (2009–14 Canterbury Bulldogs, Melbourne Storm & Penrith Panthers)

See also

Rugby league in the Northern Territory

References

External links

MacKillop Sharks Fox Sports pulse

Sport in Darwin, Northern Territory
Rugby league teams in the Northern Territory
Rugby clubs established in 1973
1973 establishments in Australia
Palmerston, Northern Territory